Arnold Abbey Mensah (born 24 November 2001) is a Ghanaian professional footballer who plays as a winger for Ghanaian Premier League side Accra Great Olympics. A native of Mamprobi in the Greater Accra Region of Ghana, he is a graduate of the University of Ghana, legon, where he studied Dental Laboratory Science and played in the school's football team.

Early life 
Abbey-Mensah is a native of Mamprobi, a suburb of Accra in the Greater Accra Region of Ghana known for producing talented sportsmen including former Ghana national team captain Stephen Appiah, Peter Ofori-Quaye and former boxing world champion Azumah Nelson. He attended the University of Ghana, where he graduated with a Bachelor of Science degree in Dental Laboratory Science.

Career

University of Ghana 
Abbey-Mensah played the University of Ghana (UG) football team whilst studying at the university for his degree. He was scouted and poached by the Teshie-based club Accra Great Olympics during the Ghana Universities Sports Association (GUSA) Games hosted by UG in January 2020. During the games he featured in 3 games and scored 1 goal and made one assist.

Great Olympics 
Abbey-Mensah in October 2020, ahead of the 2020–21 Ghana Premier League, he signed a three-year contract with Accra Great Olympics. He was named on the club's squad list for the season. He made his debut in the first match of the season, playing the full 90 minutes in a 1–1 draw against Medeama SC. On 20 November 2020, match day 2, he played the full 90 minutes to help Olympics to 3–0 victory against Legon Cities FC.

References

External links 

 

Living people
2001 births
Association football midfielders
Ghanaian footballers
University of Ghana alumni
Accra Great Olympics F.C. players
Ghana Premier League players